Max Carl Herman Wandrer (February 10, 1894 – October 1, 1978) was an American gymnast who competed in the 1924 Summer Olympics. He was born in Rudolstadt and died in Middle River, Maryland.

References

1894 births
1978 deaths
American male artistic gymnasts
Olympic gymnasts of the United States
Gymnasts at the 1924 Summer Olympics
German emigrants to the United States
Sportspeople from Thuringia
People from Rudolstadt